Poknapham is the most-read Meitei language newspaper published in Bengali script, from Imphal, Manipur in India. Poknapham means Birth Place in Meitei. It is owned and published by Gurumayum Shantikumari Devi from Keishampat Thiyam Leirak, Imphal and printed by her at Padma Printers, Imphal. A Robindro Sharma is the Editor.

Started in the year 1975 the daily is now published from Imphal, Manipur.

The online version of Poknapham was launched in June 2008 and is the first Meitei language newspaper to go online.

See also
 List of newspapers in India

References

External links
Poknapham Website

Daily newspapers published in India
Meitei-language newspapers
Newspapers established in 1975
Imphal
1975 establishments in Manipur